Peter Bock (born December 12, 1948) is a Wisconsin politician.

Born in Milwaukee, Wisconsin, Bock graduated from Marquette University High School and from the University of Wisconsin–Milwaukee. He also went to the University of Notre Dame. Bock worked at a parcel company and was a laborer. In 1986, he was elected to the Wisconsin State Assembly serving from 1987 until 2003 as a Democrat. In late 2002, upon his retirement from the Wisconsin Assembly, he married Kathleen Falk, the County Executive of Dane County, Wisconsin.

Notes

Politicians from Milwaukee
University of Wisconsin–Milwaukee alumni
University of Notre Dame alumni
1948 births
Living people
Marquette University High School alumni
Democratic Party members of the Wisconsin State Assembly